Jango is a 2021 Indian Tamil-language science fiction film directed by debutant Mano Karthikeyan and produced by Thirukumaran Entertainment and Zen Studios. The film stars debutant Satheesh Kumar and Mirnalini Ravi, and the music is composed by Ghibran. The film released theatrically on 19 November 2021.

Plot 

A neurosurgeon who is stuck in a time loop tries to save his estranged wife from being killed by a mystery man.

Cast 

 Satheesh Kumar as Gowtham
 Mirnalini Ravi as Nisha
 Hareesh Peradi as Scientist Michael
 Velu Prabhakaran
 Karunakaran
Deepa Shankar as servant
 Daniel Annie Pope as Sathyan
 Ramesh Thilak
 Tiger Thangadurai as Informer
 Anitha Sampath as Nisha's friend
 'Nakkalites' Dhanam as Gowtham's mother
 Bava Lakshmanan as a drunkard
 Sumathi as food cart lady

Soundtrack 

The soundtrack and score is composed by Ghibran. The soundtrack album featured three songs. The audio rights were acquired by Think Music.

Release
The film was released on theatres on 19 November 2021.

Reception 

Siby Jeyya of India Herald wrote, "Jango is worth watching because of the time loop perspective and other scientific topics featured in the movie." Behindwoods gave a rating of 2.5 out on 5 and wrote, "The film falls short on writing, dialogues, screenplay and performances, while the concept and Ghibran's music alone stand out. Jango misses to impress despite the potential it had. If you're a fan of sci-fi movies, the film can be watched just for the concept of time loop alone." and gave the final verdict as "Jango's idea is good on paper, but the execution could have been better. Watch it for the unique concept." Sify gave a rating of 2.5 out on 5 and wrote, "Jango is worth watching because of the time loop perspective and other scientific topics featured in the movie." Bhuvanesh Chandar of Cinema Express gave a rating of 1.5 out on 5 and wrote, "The poor writing is on display everywhere. Take the scene that tells us why the couple broke up in the first place. It’s all so hurried that you barely register the details, and there’s really no reason for why Gautham seems so… robotic. Debutant actor Satheesh looks the part, but that's it really. Even in places where he doesn’t have to be stoic, he is. All the poor lip sync in this film doesn’t help either. Another example of bad writing is how predictable the identity of the antagonist is. My biggest surprise was how this film, with as many unusual ideas, is yet so unsurprising."

See also 
 List of films featuring time loops

References

External links 
 

2021 science fiction films
Indian science fiction films
Time loop films
Films scored by Mohamaad Ghibran